List of museums in Georgia may refer to:

 List of museums in Georgia (country)
 List of museums in Georgia (U.S. state)